Brandon A. Broady (born 1986) is an American comedian, actor and television host best known for hosting BET's The Xperiment.

Early life 
Broady grew up in Silver Spring, Maryland and attended Springbrook High School and Towson University.  Birthday: January 23, 1986

References

Living people
People from Silver Spring, Maryland
Male actors from Maryland
Towson University alumni
American male comedians
American television hosts
African-American male comedians
Comedians from Maryland
1986 births
21st-century American comedians
21st-century African-American people
20th-century African-American people